Khairul Anam Shakil is a Bangladeshi singer of Nazrul Sangeet genre. He was awarded Ekushey Padak by the Government of Bangladesh in 2019.

Early life and career
Shakil graduated from Leeds Beckett University in industrial engineering in 1984. He took music lessons from his uncle Mahmudur Rahman Benu, Narayan Chandra Basak, Ustad Mohammad Sageeruddin Khan, Sheikh Lutfur Rahman, Sohrab Hossain and Anjalee Ray.

Shakil released his debut album, Meghey Meghey Andho, in 1996.

Shakil is the current vice president of Chhayanaut Cultural Organisation, and a faculty member of the Department of Music at the University of Dhaka. He  serves as the  General Secretary of Bangladesh Nazrul Sangeet Sangstha.

Awards
 6th Channeli Music Award- Best Nazrul Singer
 10th Channeli Music Award- Best Nazrul Singer
 Jatiyo Kobo Kazi Nazrul Islam University- নজরুল সঙ্গীতের প্রচার ও প্রসার এর ক্ষেত্রে বিশেষ অবদানের জন্য স্বীকৃতি সরূপ  “নজরুল সম্মাননা”(2016)
 Nazrul Institute- Nazrul Award (2017)
 National Award Ekushey Padak 2019

Personal life
Shakil's father, Mohammad Abul Khayer, was an Awami League MLA of erstwhile East Pakistan (now Bangladesh). His mother, Nilufar Khayer, was a student of Rabindra Sangeet in Bulbul Academy of Fine Arts, and was involved with Chhayanaut. 
 Shakil is married to Masuda Anam Kolpana, with two sons Zareef Anam and Wasif Anam. Masuda is also a notable  Nazrul Shongeet singer. They released a few duet music albums including Ektuku Chhoya Lagey (2017). They released their first Rabindra Sangeet album, Ektuku Chhoya Lagey in 2017. Shakil is the nephew of filmmaker Tareque Masud and brother in law of noted film maker Badal Rahman.

Works
Single albums
 Meghey Meghey Andho (1996)
 Shadh Jagey Mone (1998)
 Gobhir Nisheethey Ghum Bhengey Jaye (1999)
 Pashaner Bhangaley Ghum (2001)
 Shyamla Boron (2007)
 Chhilo Chand Megher Porey
 Gaan Guli Mor (2009)
 Shei Mukh Porey Mone (2009)
 Gobhir Nishitho Ghume (2013)
Duet albums
 Mora Aar Janamey (2007) 
 Mrittika (2008)
 Shonar Kathi Rupor Kathi (2008)
 Ektuku Chhoya Lagey (2017)

References

Living people
Alumni of Leeds Beckett University
20th-century Bangladeshi male singers
20th-century Bangladeshi singers
Bangladeshi Nazrul Geeti singers
Academic staff of the University of Dhaka
Recipients of the Ekushey Padak
Place of birth missing (living people)
Year of birth missing (living people)
21st-century Bangladeshi male singers
21st-century Bangladeshi singers